Highway 128 (AR 128, Ark. 128, and Hwy. 128) is a designation for four east–west state highways in Southwest Arkansas. One route of  begins at Highway 7 in Sparkman and runs east to Highway 9 at Holly Springs. A second route of  begins at Highway 51 at Joan and runs east to Highway 7/Highway 8 at Gravel Junction. A third route begins at Highway 7 near DeGray Lake Resort State Park and runs east and north to US Highway 270 Business (US 270B) in Hot Springs. A fourth route begins at Highway 5 in Fountain Lake and runs east to US 70. All routes are maintained by the Arkansas Department of Transportation (ArDOT).

Route description
All four routes are low-traffic, two-lane, undivided roads winding through the Piney Woods of Southwest Arkansas. No segment of Highway 157 has been listed as part of the National Highway System, a network of roads important to the nation's economy, defense, and mobility.

The ArDOT maintains Highway 128 like all other parts of the state highway system. As a part of these responsibilities, the department tracks the volume of traffic using its roads in surveys using a metric called average annual daily traffic (AADT). ArDOT estimates the traffic level for a segment of roadway for any average day of the year in these surveys.

Sparkman to Holly Springs
Highway 128 begins at Sparkman, a small town in rural Dallas County. It runs due east as Main Street, passing Sparkman Elementary School and Sparkman High School before entering downtown. Continuing east, Highway 128 exits the town and enters a rural, forested area. It passes through the unincorporated community of New Hope, and intersects Highway 207 at Pine Grove. Near Pine Grove, Highway 128 passes the historic Sardis Methodist Church, listed on the National Register of Historic Places (NRHP). Continuing southeasterly, Highway 128 passes near the Brazeale Homestead, also listed on the NRHP, before crossing Tulip Creek and White Oak Creek. Southeast of these creek crossings, a proposed intersection with Highway 273 is marked on the county map produced by ArDOT (as of January 2018). The Highway 273 extension was approved in 1973, but remains unbuilt. Highway 128 continues southeast to Holly Springs, passing the NRHP-listed Capt. Goodgame House. In Holly Springs, Highway 128 terminates at an intersection with Highway 9.

AADT for the highway was highest at the western terminus, 1,600 vehicles per day. Outside the city limits of Sparkman, the traffic counts dropped below 1,000 with a low of 740 between Pine Grove and Holly Springs.

Joan to Gravel Ridge
The highway begins at Highway 51 east of Arkadelphia. It runs south through a sparsely populated rural area with swamps, sloughs, and pine trees, crossing L'eau Frais Creek and becoming a section line road southbound. The highway passes a small, discontinuous segment of the Big Timber Wildlife Management Area (WMA) south of the creek crossing. Highway 128 turns west at Mill Creek, terminating at an intersection with Highway 7/Highway 8 at Gravel Junction. Other than the termini, Highway 128 does not intersect any other state highways. AADT for the highway was estimated to be 270 VPD at a point north of the route's midpoint in 2016.

De Gray Lake Resort State Park to Hot Springs

Highway 128 begins north of DeGray Lake Resort State Park in the Ouachita Mountains. It runs east across Caney Creek to Caney, where it serves as the northern terminus of Highway 283. Highway 128 turns north at the junction, weaving through a sparsely populated pine forest. The route briefly overlaps Highway 84 at De Roche. North of the overlap, Highway 128 becomes the eastern edge of the Jack Mountain WMA, which offers deer, turkey, and bear hunting (among others) to permitted hunters through the Arkansas Game and Fish Commission (AGFC). Upon entering Garland County, Highway 128 begins an overlap with Highway 290 around the southeastern edge of Lake Hamilton, with the concurrency ending just north of Red Oak. The highway bridges the Ouachita River between Lake Hamilton and Lake Catherine just east of Carpenter Dam before entering Hot Springs, the county seat of Garland County, where it becomes Carpenter Dam Road. Highway 128 winds north through an undeveloped section of the city before crossing US Highway 70 (US 70) and US 270, known as the Dr. Martin Luther King Jr. Expressway in Hot Springs, at exit 7. North of this interchange, the highway passes an industrial facility and the Arkansas State Police Troop K Headquarters before terminating at a junction with US 270B (Malvern Avenue).

Fountain Lake to US 70
In northeast Garland County, Highway 128 begins at Highway 5 (Park Avenue) in Fountain Lake. The entire length of the highway is known as Lonsdale Cutoff Road.

The highway runs east across the South Fork Ouachita River, with a historic 1928 bridge paralleling the highway's modern span. East of the town, Highway 128 passes through rural forested area, nearing the Saline County line before turning southward. Highway 128 briefly enters Saline County before returning to Garland County, intersecting US 70, where the route terminates. The roadway continues south to Lonsdale as a county road. AADT for the highway was estimated to be 1,700 VPD near the eastern terminus in 2016.

History
The original Highway 128 was created in 1928, from Highway 27 southwest of Murfreesboro southwest to Highway 24 (now US 371). In 1937, Highway 128 became part of Highway 26, and State Road 7A between Holly Springs and Pine Grove was renumbered as Highway 128. Highway 128 was extended later.

Major intersections

See also

References

External links

128
Transportation in Clark County, Arkansas
Transportation in Dallas County, Arkansas
Transportation in Garland County, Arkansas
Transportation in Hot Spring County, Arkansas
Transportation in Saline County, Arkansas